Lucas Chiaretti Cossenzo (born September 22, 1987) is a Brazilian football player.

Club career
Chiaretti spent five years of his career in Italy. He arrived in December 2009 signing for Lega Pro Prima Divisione side A.S. Andria BAT (31 caps, 2 goals). In January 2011 he moved to A.S. Taranto Calcio (41 caps, 8 goals). For the 2012–13 season he signed for Serie A side Delfino Pescara 1936, but he only played one match of Coppa Italia in two seasons. At the end of the 2013–14 season he became freeagent.

In February 2015, he signed with the Brazilian Série B side Clube Atlético Bragantino.

On 5 October 2020, his contract with Pordenone was terminated by mutual consent.

References

External links
J. League (#35)

1987 births
Living people
Brazilian footballers
Brazilian expatriate footballers
J1 League players
Gamba Osaka players
Associação Desportiva Cabofriense players
S.S. Fidelis Andria 1928 players
Taranto F.C. 1927 players
Delfino Pescara 1936 players
Clube Atlético Bragantino players
A.S. Cittadella players
Calcio Foggia 1920 players
Serie B players
Serie C players
Expatriate footballers in Japan
Brazilian expatriate sportspeople in Japan
Expatriate footballers in Italy
Brazilian expatriate sportspeople in Italy
Association football wingers
Footballers from Belo Horizonte